The Ray (also known as Run & Gun) is a 2022 American action thriller film written and directed by Christopher Borrelli. The film stars Mark Dacascos, Janel Parrish, Celestino Cornielle, Ben Milliken, Richard Kind, Brad William Henke, Hudson Yang, and Ari Barkan. 

Set in the ruins of the Salton Sea and follows Ray, a former criminal evading a series of ruthless killers led by eccentric mob boss, Grayson. Ray finds refuge with a mysterious good Samaritan, but it soon becomes apparent, however, he has walked into the nest of someone even more dangerous than the killers pursuing him.

Cast
 Mark Dacascos as Brando
 Janel Parrish as Faith
 Celestino Cornielle as Ninni / Gerardo
 Ben Milliken as Ray
 Ari Barkan as Perry
 Richard Kind as Grayson
 Brad William Henke as Billings
 Hudson Yang as Cal

Production
The film was filmed in Albuquerque, New Mexico, set in the ruins of the Salton Sea.

References

External links

American action thriller films